The black-belted flowerpecker (Dicaeum haematostictum) or Visayan flowerpecker, is a species of bird in the family Dicaeidae. It is endemic to the Philippines where it is restricted to Panay, Negros and Guimaras islands. It was formerly regarded as a subspecies of the more widespread red-keeled flowerpecker (D. australe). Sometimes the name red-keeled flowerpecker is used for D. haematostictum and D. australe is then known as the red-sided flowerpecker.

Description 
EBird describes the bird as "A small bird of forest and fairly open woodland from the lowlands to lower elevations in the mountains. Black above, glossed blue, with white underparts marked by a red patch from the chest to the belly, bordered with black around the top. Note the fairly long slender bill. Similar to Fire-breasted Flowerpecker, but has black above the red patch rather than below. Voice includes high-pitched piping as well as “chik!” notes more typical of a flowerpecker."

It is seen feeding on flowering and fruiting trees.

Habitat and conservation status 
It inhabits tropical moist lowland forest up to 1,000 meters above sea level. It prefers primary forest and secondary forest but has been known to visit cultivations and coconut plantations 

IUCN has assessed this bird as least concern with the population being estimated at 6,000 to 15,000 mature individuals. This species' main threat is habitat loss.

Habitat loss on both Panay and Negros  has been extensive. Primary forests have been almost totally destroyed on Negros (where just 4% of any type of forest cover remained in 1988) and Panay (where 8% remained). Habitat degradation, through clearance for agriculture, timber and charcoal-burning, continues to pose a serious threat to remaining fragments. It is already possibly extinct on Guimaras.

It occurs on a few protected areas  Northern Negros Natural Park and Mt. Canlaon National Park and Balinsasayao Twin Lakes Natural Park.

Conservation actions proposed include to conduct surveys in potentially suitable habitat in order to calculate density estimates, and calculate remaining extent of suitable habitat to refine the population estimate and promote areas where it is present to be protected. Promote more effective protection of the Northern Negros Natural Park and other remaining lowland forest tracts in the Western Visayas.

References

External links
BirdLife Species Factsheet.

black-belted flowerpecker
Birds of Panay
Birds of Negros Island
Fauna of Guimaras
black-belted flowerpecker
Taxonomy articles created by Polbot